Tehelné pole or National football stadium is a multi-use stadium in Bratislava, Slovakia. It was completed in 2019 and is used for football matches, including the home matches of ŠK Slovan Bratislava and the Slovakia national football team. This project concerns mutual assistance between well-known Slovak entrepreneur Ivan Kmotrík as the owner of ŠK Slovan Bratislava and the Government of Slovakia. The stadium has a capacity of 22,500 spectators, and replaced the old Tehelné pole stadium, which was demolished in summer 2013.

Location
Tehelné pole was a neighborhood in Bratislava, Slovakia, characterized by the presence of several sports facilities. Administratively, the neighborhood belongs to Nové Mesto borough, situated around 5 km north-east of the centre. The German and Hungarian names for this locality are Ziegelfeld and Téglamező.

Transport
Tehelné Pole is located in the third district of Bratislava, Slovakia. The arena can be approached by tram, trolleybus and bus.

Drivers can park directly under the National Football Stadium. There is space for 994 cars. An additional 365 parking spaces are offered at the Ondrej Nepela Arena, which is approximately 300 m away from the stadium or Polus City Center, which offers 1,683 parking spaces. This shopping center is located on Vajnorská 100 street, which is 350 m away.

Milestone matches
The first match was played at the stadium on 16 January 2019. Only holders of season tickets had access to the friendly game between Slovan and Czech First League side Sigma Olomouc. The first competitive match took place on 3 March 2019. In the 21st round of the Slovak League, Slovan defeated their main rivals Trnava in front of sold-out stands. On 11 May 2019, Slovan, who had already clinched the title, defeated Žilina 6–2 in a special match, which was dedicated to the 100th anniversary of the club's establishment. Slovan had celebrated this anniversary on 3 May. On 24 May 2019, Slovan defeated Sereď 3–1 in the last league round. After the match, the first championship celebrations took place at the stadium.

As league champion, Slovan qualified for the 2019–20 UEFA Champions League. The first European match at the stadium took place on 10 July 2019. In it, Slovan drew with 
Sutjeska Nikšić, the champion of Montenegro. Two weeks later, the first Europa League game was played at the stadium. In the second qualifying round, Slovan played against Feronikeli from Kosovo. Slovan then advanced to the group stage of the competition and played against Besiktas, Wolverhampton and Braga.

On 13 October 2019, the first international match took place at Tehelné pole. Slovakia drew with Paraguay in a friendly.

On 4 December 2019, Slovan played their first match in the Slovak Cup at the stadium, defeating Žilina 2–0. On 8 July 2020, the stadium hosted the 2020 Slovak Cup Final. Slovan defeated Ružomberok 1–0 and celebrated victory at their home stadium.

On 16 September 2021, the first Conference League match was played at Tehelné pole. Slovan lost to Copenhagen in the group stage of the newly created competition.

Notes

International matches

Image gallery

Concert venue
The stadium also serves as a concert venue. Slovak band Elán was the first band to perform at the National Football Stadium. The list of concerts can be seen below:

Other stadiums/venues nearby
Other stadiums or venues near Tehelné pole locality include Štadión Pasienky (built 1962), home ground of FK Inter Bratislava, ice hockey Ondrej Nepela Arena (built 2011), home of the team HC Slovan Bratislava and the National Tennis Centre (built 2003), which is used for Fed Cup as well as Davis Cup matches, concerts and other events.

References

External links
Modern Tehelná NFS on the field with a capacity of 22,000 seats
State to finance Sk3 billion football stadium

Football venues in Slovakia
Sports venues completed in 2019
Sport in Bratislava
Buildings and structures in Bratislava
ŠK Slovan Bratislava
Slovakia